Kamelabad may refer to:
 Kamelabad, East Azerbaijan
 Kamelabad, West Azerbaijan

See also
Kamalabad (disambiguation)